Christian Robert Pierre Argentin (11 October 1893 – 27 November 1955) was a French stage and film actor.

Argentin was born in Elbeuf, Seine-Inférieure (now Seine-Maritime), France and died in Paris. He made his film debut in a 1912 short titled Alerte! and his final film in the 1955 Daniel Gélin-directed drama Les dents longues (The Long Teeth).

Filmography 
 1923 : L'Enfant roi
 1931 : Luck : a owner
 1931 : La Chienne : a judge
 1931 : When Do You Commit Suicide?
 1931 : The Man in Evening Clothes
 1932 : Avec l’assurance
 1932 : Coiffeur pour dames : Louvet
 1932 : La Perle : Médios
 1932 : Pour vivre heureux : Ruffat
 1932 : A Star Disappears : Lui-même
 1933 : Iris perdue et retrouvée
 1933 : The Agony of the Eagles : Minister Villèle
 1934 : Arlette et ses papas : professor
 1934 : Fanatisme : Pietri
 1934 : The Last Billionaire : Finance Minister
 1934 : Si j'étais le patron : Sicaud
 1934 : Une Vocation irrésistible
 1935 : La Mariée du régiment
 1935 : La Sonnette d'alarme : Professor Bodart
 1936 : The King : Gabrier
 1936 : Les Petites alliées
 1936 : Marthe Richard, au service de la France : admiral
 1938 : Crossroads : Anwalt, lawyer
 1938 : J'étais une aventurière : Van Kongen
 1938 : L'Ange que j'ai vendu : Staphoulos
 1938 : La Route enchantée : a director
 1938 : Place de la Concorde
 1940 : Cavalcade d'amour : a chaplain
 1940 : Sur le plancher des vaches : a director
 1941 : Cartacalha, reine des gitans
 1942 : The Trump Card : a hotel manager
 1947 : Si jeunesse savait : Villemotte
 1948 : Clochemerle : bishop
 1949 : La Veuve et l'Innocent : a minister
 1952 : La Fête à Henriette : l'Excellence
 1952 : Les Dents longues : Bronnier
 1952 : Monsieur Leguignon, Signalman : a lawyer for plaintiff
 1954 : Crainquebille : a lawyer
 1953 : Le Défroqué : an officer
 1954 : Ma petite folie : a jeweller

Theatre 
 1925 : Les Marchands de gloire de Marcel Pagnol et Paul Nivoix, théâtre de la Madeleine
 1931 : La Crise ministérielle de Tristan Bernard, théâtre Albert 1er
 1931 : Le Sauvage de Tristan Bernard, mise en scène Henri Burguet, théâtre Albert 1er
 1932 : 5 à 7 d'Andrée Mery, théâtre de la Potinière
 1951 : Le Visiteur d'Albert Dubeux, théâtre Daunou

References

External links
 

1893 births
1955 deaths
French male film actors
French male stage actors
People from Elbeuf
20th-century French male actors